Qazi Syed Hayatullah (died c. 1135 AH / 1722 AD) was a Muslim scholar of Fiqh from Sakras, District Mewat (Haryana, India). He belonged to the family of Gardēzī Sadaat.

Biography
Qazi Syed Hayatullah was a scholar of Fiqh, an expert in sharia laws, from Sakras, District Mewat (Haryana). He was also a good orator and stayed at Aurangabad for a long time, where he gained both name and fame in teaching Fiqh. At Sakras, he built a rich library after collecting large number of books. He also built his own beautiful Haveli at Mohallah Sayidwadi.

Family

His ancestors Syed Shamsuddin Sani (alias Syed Chajju Jagat Jaut ibn Mir Imaduddin ibn Syed Shamsuddin) came to India during the reign of Sultan Shams-ud-din Iltutmish (1211–1235).

Like his father Qazi Syed Inayatullah, his wife also belonged to Pinangwan. He had one daughter, who was married to Mohammad Ammad of Pinangwan, and two sons: Syed Mohammad Zaman and Syed Mohammad Mureed.

Syed Mohammad Zaman was affirmed Qazi after his father.

Syed Mohammad Mureed had a horse business. He was not only a good horse rider but also an expert in Archery. He, most of the times, stayed in Ujjain and hence after death also buried near Ujjain at Dargah Shah Mahmood, Ghalla Mandi along with his father-in-law Mohammad Ikram and brother-in-law Abu Ishaq. Syed Mohammad Mureed with his wife Noorun Nisan had one son Mohammad Muneer and three daughters, Bibi Sahiba, Jamiatun Nisan and Sahibun Nisan. Bibi Sahiba was married to Mohammad Aziz ibn Mohammad Azim (husband of Bibi Khadija daughter of Mohammad Asadullah), while Jamiatun Nisan and Sahibun Nisan were married to Abu Turab (son of Qazi Ghulam Murtaza) and Mohammad Munawwar (son of Mohammad Adil) respectively. Jamiatun Nisan had one daughter Jamal Daulat and two sons Mian Mohammad Yar and Mohammad Hasan. Mohammad Hasan along with Ghulam Qutubuddin, was killed in a battle with Ahirs on 26 August 1797 at Rewari. In the same battle, another relative to Mohammad Hasan, Syed Hisamuddin with his colleague Ahmad Beg Khan was also killed by Ahirs and their graves are located besides the wall of Masjid located inside the fort. The son of Mohammad Hasan, Ghulam Saroor was a prominent physician who died in Mecca, after performing Hajj on 11 Moharram 1294 AH. Mian Mohammad Yar (born 1176 AH / 1762 AD) was quite a religious person and was married to Wajihun Nisan (daughter of Shah Abul Ghais). The son of Mohammad Yar Mohammad Ali was married to Sahibun Nisan (daughter of Shah Mohammad Shoeb).

Mohammad Muneer was married to the daughter of Syed Aminuddin ibn Syed Nasiruddin and had one daughter Fahamun Nisan, who was married to Mohammad Rasheed (died 10 Rabi' al-awwal 1203 AH/1788 AD). Fahamun Nisan had two sons – Aulad Ali and Murad Ali. Both had good business of horses. The daughter of Murad Ali, Fahimun Nisan was married on 12 Shawwal 1246 AH / 1830 AD with Aminuddin ibn Fasihuddin. While returning from Hajj in 1852, Aminuddin died as a result of a storm surge in the Indian Ocean.

See also 
Qazi Syed Rafi Mohammad
Qazi Syed Inayatullah
Qazi Syed Mohammad Rafi
Ghulam Mansoor
Syed Ziaur Rahman

References 

1722 deaths
18th-century Indian people
People from Mewat
Hanafis
Indian Sunni Muslim scholars of Islam
People from Ferozepur Jhirka
Gardēzī Sadaat
Year of birth unknown
Muslim scholars of Islamic jurisprudence